Aquinas Catholic Schools is a private, Roman Catholic K-12 school institution in David City, Nebraska, United States. It is located in the Roman Catholic Diocese of Lincoln.

It consists of an elementary campus and a middle and high school campus.

Activities
Aquinas is a member of the Nebraska School Activities Association. They have won the following NSAA State Championships:

 Boys' football - 1980, 1993, 1994, 1997, 2011, 2012, 2014, 2015 (runner-ip - 1981, 1992, 2013)
 Boys' cross country - 2002, 2003, 2020
 Boys' basketball - 1997, 2006
 Boys' wrestling-individual - 1994, 2001, 2002, 2004
 Boys' wrestling-dual - 2020
 Boys' track and field - 2005, 2021
 Girls' track and field - 1979, 1981, 1982
 Girls' volleyball - 2009
 Girls' cross country - 2016
 Coed play production - 2011, 2018, 2019
 Coed speech - 1996

References

External links
 School website

Roman Catholic Diocese of Lincoln
Catholic secondary schools in Nebraska
Private middle schools in Nebraska
Private elementary schools in Nebraska
Private K-12 schools in the United States
Schools in Butler County, Nebraska
Educational institutions established in 1961
1961 establishments in Nebraska